The William T. Vogler Cottage, also known as the Locust Grove Cottage, was a historic home located in Roaring Gap, Alleghany County, North Carolina. It was built in 1908–1909, and was a -story Queen Anne style influenced frame cottage. It featured an expansive, wrap-around attached porch. Also on the property were a contributing garage from the 1920s and a yard. It has been demolished.

It was listed on the National Register of Historic Places in 1991.

References

Houses on the National Register of Historic Places in North Carolina
Queen Anne architecture in North Carolina
Houses completed in 1909
Houses in Alleghany County, North Carolina
National Register of Historic Places in Alleghany County, North Carolina